The Russian Cup 1994–95 was the third season of the Russian football knockout tournament since the dissolution of Soviet Union.

First round

May 8, 1994.

May 9, 1994.

Second round

May 29, 1994.

Third round

June 25, 1994.

June 26, 1994.

June 27, 1994.

Fourth round

August 26, 1994.

August 27, 1994.

Round of 32

Russian Premier League teams started at this stage.

Round of 16

Quarter-finals

Semi-finals

Final

Oleg Veretennikov hit the goalpost from a penalty kick in the 115th minute of the game.

Played in the earlier stages, but not in the final:

FC Dynamo Moscow: Valeri Kleimyonov (GK), Yuri Kovtun (DF), Sergey Timofeev  (DF), Andrei Chernyshov (DF), Aleksandr Borodkin (DF), Aleksei Filippov (DF), Vagiz Khidiyatullin (DF), Andrei Ivanov (DF), Denis Klyuyev (MF), Dmitri Cheryshev (FW), Igor Simutenkov (FW), Kirill Rybakov (FW), Yuri Tishkov (FW).

FC Rotor Volgograd: Volodymyr Gerashchenko  (DF), Aleksandr Yeshchenko (MF), Konstantin Kulik  (MF), Dmitri Ivanov (MF), Valery Yesipov (MF), Yuri Aksyonov  (MF), Rustem Khuzin (FW).

References

Russian Cup seasons
Russian Cup
Cup
Cup